The Brisbane Invitational was an annual women's golf tournament held at McLeod Country Golf Club in Brisbane, Australia. It was part of the ALPG Tour between 2015 and 2019.

When the tournament started in 2015 it was the first professional women's golf tournament held in Brisbane for over 35 years.

In 2016, Stacey Keating needed a par at the par-3 18th hole to force a playoff with Kyla Inaba of Canada and Norwegian Tonje Daffinrud, but holed a putt from 15 meters to claim the victory outright.

Winners

References

External links

ALPG Tour events
Golf tournaments in Australia
Golf in Queensland
Sports competitions in Brisbane